This is a list of Sheriffs of Merionethshire (or Sheriffs of Meirionnydd). The historic county of Merioneth was originally created in 1284. The administrative county of Merioneth was created from the historic county under the Local Government Act 1888.

A Sheriff is the legal representative of the monarch, and is appointed annually for each county in Wales and England. Their duty is to keep the peace in the county, and to ensure the country follows the law of the monarch. Originally, the job was a position of status and strength, but today it is principally a ceremonial role.

On 1 April 1974, under the provisions of the Local Government Act 1972, the shrievalties of Merionethshire, together with that of Anglesey and Caernarvonshire were abolished, being replaced by the new office of High Sheriff of Gwynedd.

List of Sheriffs

1392: Griffith ap Llewellyn	
c. 1400: Einion ap Ithel
1433: John Hampton
1464: Roger Kynaston
c. 1485: Piers Stanley and Richard Pole

16th century

17th century

18th century

19th Century

20th Century

References

Further reading
—Gives the years but not the months.
—Gives the years but not the months.

 
Merionethshire
Merionethshire